Muticaria macrostoma is a species of small air-breathing land snail, a terrestrial pulmonate gastropod mollusk in the family Clausiliidae, the door snails, all of which have a clausilium.

This species is endemic to the Mediterranean island of Malta.

References

External links 
 "Species summary for Muticaria macrostoma". AnimalBase.

Clausiliidae
Gastropods described in 1835
Taxonomy articles created by Polbot